Cromac can refer to:

Cromac, Haute-Vienne in France
Belfast Cromac (Northern Ireland Parliament constituency)
Belfast Cromac (UK Parliament constituency)